Mamadou Diouldé Bah (born 25 April 1988) is a Guinean professional footballer who plays as a midfielder for US Raon-l'Étape. He represented the Guinea national team from 2008 to 2012.

Club career
Born in Conakry, Bah began his career at Friguiabé FC before joining Athlético de Coléah in 2005. After one year, he left the club and joined the RC Strasbourg youth squad in 2006.

On 31 August 2010, Bah moved to VfB Stuttgart. However, he failed to find a regular first team place. On 4 September 2011, in the 2012 Africa Cup of Nations qualifying match against Ethiopia, he broke his left hand. Until the end of the 2012–13 season, Stuttgart decided not to offer him an extended contract leaving him a free agent.

On 5 January 2014, Bah rejoined his first professional club Strasbourg on a one-year-and-a-half contract.

International career
He made his international debut for his homeland Guinea at the 2008 African Cup of Nations in Ghana, where Guinea was eliminated at the quarter final by Côte d'Ivoire.

International goals
Scores and results list Guinea's goal tally first, score column indicates score after each Bah goal.

References

External links
 
 

Living people
1988 births
Sportspeople from Conakry
Association football midfielders
Guinean footballers
Guinea international footballers
2008 Africa Cup of Nations players
2012 Africa Cup of Nations players
Athlético de Coléah players
RC Strasbourg Alsace players
VfB Stuttgart players
ASPV Strasbourg players
US Raon-l'Étape players
Ligue 1 players
Ligue 2 players
Championnat National players
Championnat National 3 players
Bundesliga players
Guinean expatriate footballers
Expatriate footballers in France
Expatriate footballers in Germany